Stretch is a 2011 English-language French sports film directed by Charles de Meaux and starring Nicolas Cazalé, Fan Bingbing and David Carradine. It marks Carradine's last screen appearance, as he died during filming in Bangkok. After his death, his widow Annie Bierman sued MK2 Productions, the film's production company, for negligence.

Synopsis 
After failing a drug test in France, young jockey Christophe moves to Macau, where he becomes involved in the city's fast-paced racing world. However, his luck seems to be running out when his trainer asks him to lose a race. With the help of beautiful Pamsy, he must find a way to avoid antagonizing the Chinese mafia.

Cast

Production 
De Meaux used his experiences as a former jockey while making the film. For his role as a jockey Cazalé was forced to lose a large amount of weight. Stretch was shot in France at the Longchamp Racecourse and the Maisons-Laffitte Racecourse. Other scenes were filmed in Bangkok, Thailand and Macao. In Bangkok, three days before shooting wrapped David Carradine was found dead in his hotel, apparently from accidental asphyxiation. After Carradine's death, his widow Annie Bierman sued MK2 Productions, the film's production company, for negligence. Meaux rewrote the script and reduced his screen time to around three minutes although the characters frequently talk about Carradine's character and David is heard off camera. The film's release was delayed when Carradine's widow accused MK2 of negligence and sued them for wrongful death.

References

External links 
 

2011 films
2010s English-language films
English-language French films
2011 thriller films
French thriller films
French horse racing films
2010s French films